Linlithgow Pursuivant of Arms is a Scottish pursuivant of arms of the Court of the Lord Lyon.

This title is locative in origin, and is derived from the name of a royal burgh of Linlithgow and palace of the same name. The title is often used for a Pursuivant Extraordinary.

The badge of office is A greyhound bitch passant Sable ensigned of a coronet of four fleur de lys (two visible) and four crosses pattee (one and two halves visible) Or.

The office is currently held by Professor Gillian Black.

Holders of the office

See also
Officer of Arms
Pursuivant
Court of the Lord Lyon
Heraldry Society of Scotland

References

External links
The Court of the Lord Lyon



Court of the Lord Lyon
Offices of arms